National Highway 314 (NH 314) starts from Dhaldanga, Bankura district  and ends at Purulia, both places in the state of West Bengal. The highway was previously known as NH 60A.

Route
 Ladhurka
 Madhuban
 Lalpur
 Hura
 Bishpuria
 Bhagabanpur

See also
 List of National Highways in India (by Highway Number)
 List of National Highways in India
 National Highways Development Project

References

External links
  NH network map of India

314
National highways in India